Bald Mountain is a mountain in Bergen County, New Jersey, just south of the New York state line. It is part of Ringwood State Park in the Ramapo Mountains. This summit is the highest elevation in Bergen County.

References

External links 
 Ringwood State Park

Mountains of Bergen County, New Jersey
Mountains of New Jersey
Ramapos